Lethrinus is a genus of emperors found from the eastern Atlantic Ocean through the Indian Ocean to the western Pacific Ocean.

Species
There are currently 27 recognized species in this genus:
 Lethrinus amboinensis Bleeker, 1854 (Ambon emperor)
 Lethrinus atkinsoni Seale, 1910 (Pacific yellowtail emperor)
 Lethrinus atlanticus Valenciennes, 1830 (Atlantic emperor)
 Lethrinus borbonicus Valenciennes, 1830 (Snubnose emperor)
 Lethrinus conchyliatus (J. L. B. Smith, 1959) (Redaxil emperor)
 Lethrinus crocineus J. L. B. Smith, 1959 (Yellowtail emperor)
 Lethrinus enigmaticus J. L. B. Smith, 1959 (Blackeye emperor)
 Lethrinus erythracanthus Valenciennes, 1830 (Orange-spotted emperor)
 Lethrinus erythropterus Valenciennes, 1830 (Longfin emperor)
 Lethrinus genivittatus Valenciennes, 1830 (Longspine emperor)
 Lethrinus haematopterus Temminck & Schlegel, 1844 (Chinese emperor)
 Lethrinus harak (Forsskål, 1775) (Thumbprint emperor)
 Lethrinus laticaudis Alleyne & W. J. Macleay, 1877 (Grass emperor)
 Lethrinus lentjan (Lacépède, 1802) (Pink ear emperor)
 Lethrinus mahsena (Forsskål, 1775) (Sky emperor)
 Lethrinus microdon Valenciennes, 1830 (Smalltooth emperor)
 Lethrinus miniatus (J. R. Forster, 1801) (Trumpet emperor)
 Lethrinus mitchelli G. R. Allen, Victor & Erdmann, 2021
 Lethrinus nebulosus (Forsskål, 1775) (Spangled emperor)
 Lethrinus obsoletus (Forsskål, 1775) (Orange-striped emperor)
 Lethrinus olivaceus Valenciennes, 1830 (Longface emperor)
 Lethrinus ornatus Valenciennes, 1830 (Ornate emperor)
 Lethrinus ravus K. E. Carpenter & J. E. Randall, 2003 (Drab emperor)
 Lethrinus reticulatus Valenciennes, 1830 (Red snout emperor)
 Lethrinus rubrioperculatus Torao Sato, 1978 (Spotcheek emperor)
 Lethrinus semicinctus Valenciennes, 1830 (Black blotch emperor)
 Lethrinus variegatus Valenciennes, 1830 (Slender emperor)
 Lethrinus xanthochilus Klunzinger, 1870 (Yellowlip emperor)

Gallery

References

Lethrinidae
Taxa named by Georges Cuvier
Marine fish genera